Morson is a surname. Notable people with the surname include:

Albert Clifford Morson (1881–1975), British surgeon
Gary Saul Morson (born 1948), American literary critic
Georgiana Morson, British social reformer
Walter Morson (1851–1921), Canadian lawyer and politician

See also
Lorson
Morton (surname)